Jorge Ramos may refer to:

 Jorge Ramos (wrestler) (born 1949), Cuban Olympic wrestler
 Jorge L. Ramos (born 1950), news anchor for Telemundo, New York
 Jorge Ramos (news anchor) (born 1958), Mexican-American news anchor for Noticiero Univision
 Jorge Ramos Peña (born 1961), Puerto Rican politician
 Jorge Ramos Hernández (born 1968), municipal president of Tijuana
 Jorge Ramos (Brazilian footballer) (born 1978), Brazilian football manager and former striker
 Jorge Luis Ramos (born 1992), Colombian football forward
 Jorge Ramos (commentator) (fl. 1998-present), Uruguayan association football commentator for ESPN Deportes